José Antonio Llamas Martínez (born 28 February 1985) is a Spanish footballer who plays for UE Sant Andreu as a right back.

Honours
Spain U17
UEFA–CAF Meridian Cup: 2003

External links

1985 births
Living people
Footballers from Terrassa
Spanish footballers
Association football defenders
Segunda División players
Segunda División B players
Tercera División players
FC Barcelona C players
FC Barcelona Atlètic players
CE L'Hospitalet players
Racing de Ferrol footballers
Alicante CF footballers
Granada CF footballers
UD Melilla footballers
CD Leganés players
SD Huesca footballers
UE Sant Andreu footballers
Spain youth international footballers